Valen Church is a parish church of the Church of Norway in Kvinnherad Municipality in Vestland county, Norway. It is located in the village of Valen. It is one of the three churches for the Husnes og Holmedal parish which is part of the Sunnhordland prosti (deanery) in the Diocese of Bjørgvin. The modern, brown, wooden church was built in a rectangular design in 1978 using plans drawn up by the architect Aksel Fronth. The church seats about 300 people.

History
During the 1970s, planning for a new church in Valen took place. The architect Aksel Fronth was hired to design the building. It has a very similar design to Landro Church and Olsvik Church which Fronth also designed. The new church was completed and consecrated in 1978.

See also
List of churches in Bjørgvin

References

Kvinnherad
Churches in Vestland
Rectangular churches in Norway
Wooden churches in Norway
20th-century Church of Norway church buildings
Churches completed in 1978
1978 establishments in Norway